The Eritrean–Ethiopian War, also known as the Badme War, was a major armed conflict between Ethiopia and Eritrea that took place from May 1998 to June 2000. The war has its origins in a territorial dispute between the two states. After Eritrea gained independence from Ethiopia, relations were initially friendly. However, disagreements about where the newly created international border should be caused relations to deteriorate significantly, eventually leading to full scale war. According to a 2005 ruling by an international commission, Eritrea broke international law and triggered the war by invading Ethiopia. By 2000, Ethiopia held all of the disputed territory and had advanced into Eritrea. The war officially came to an end with the signing of the Algiers Agreement in 12 December 2000; however, the ensuing border conflict would continue on for nearly two decades.

Eritrea and Ethiopia both spent considerable amount of their revenue and wealth on the armament ahead of the war, and reportedly suffered between 70,000–300,000 deaths combined as a direct consequence thereof, excluding an indeterminate number of refugees. The conflict ultimately led to minor border changes through final binding border delimitation overseen by the Permanent Court of Arbitration.

After the war ended, the Eritrea–Ethiopia Boundary Commission, a body established by the Algiers Agreement, concluded that Badme, the disputed territory at the heart of the conflict, belongs to Eritrea. On 5 June 2018, the ruling coalition of Ethiopia, headed by Prime Minister Abiy Ahmed, agreed to fully implement the peace treaty signed with Eritrea in 2000, with peace declared by both parties in July 2018, twenty years after the initial confrontation.

Background

From 1961 until 1991, Eritrea fought a long war of independence against Ethiopia; during this period, the Ethiopian Civil War also began on 12 September 1974, when the Derg staged a coup d'état against Emperor Haile Selassie. Both conflicts lasted until 1991 when the Ethiopian People's Revolutionary Democratic Front (EPRDF) – a coalition of rebel groups led by the Tigray People's Liberation Front (TPLF) – overthrew the Derg government, and installed a transitional government in the Ethiopian capital Addis Ababa. During the civil war, the groups fighting the Derg government had a common enemy, so the TPLF allied itself with the Eritrean People's Liberation Front (EPLF).

In 1991, as part of the United Nations-facilitated transition of power, it was agreed that the EPLF should set up an autonomous transitional government in Eritrea and organize a referendum. This referendum was held in April 1993, and the vote was overwhelmingly in favour of independence, leading to the establishment of a new state joining the United Nations. Also in 1991, the transitional government of Eritrea and the TPLF-led transitional government of Ethiopia agreed to set up a commission, to look into any problems that arose between the two former wartime allies over the foreseen independence of Eritrea. This commission was not successful, and during the following years relations between the governments of the two sovereign states deteriorated. Eritrea soon began a practice of forcibly expelling Ethiopians from its territory. As early as 1991, about 30,000 wives and children of Ethiopian soldiers stationed in Eritrea were bused by Eritrean forces across the border, and crowded into camps in Adigrat, Adwa and Axum, with the EPLF telling relief officials to expect 150,000 more Ethiopian civilians. Reportedly, many of the deportees were people who were being dismissed from their jobs, some of them longtime residents of Eritrea.

Determining the border between the two states also became a major source of conflict. In November 1997, a committee was set up to try to resolve it. Before Eritrean independence, the border had been of minor importance, as it was only a demarcation line between federated provinces, and initially, the two governments tacitly agreed that the border should remain as it had been immediately before independence. Upon independence, however, the border became an international frontier, and the two governments could not agree on where, specifically, the border should be demarcated; they looked back to colonial-era treaties between the Italian Empire and Ethiopia as a basis for the precise boundaries between the states. Problems then arose, because they could not agree on the interpretation of those agreements and treaties, and it was not clear, under international law, how binding colonial treaties were on the two states.

Analysis 
Writing after the war had finished, Jon Abbink postulated that President Isaias Afewerki of Eritrea realised that his influence over the government in Ethiopia was slipping, and "in the absence of a concrete border being marked," calculated that Eritrea could annex Badme. If successful, this acquisition could have been used to enhance his reputation and help maintain Eritrea's privileged economic relationship with Ethiopia. However, because Badme was in Tigray Province – the region from which many of the members of the Ethiopian government originated (including Meles Zenawi, the Ethiopian prime minister) – the Ethiopian government came under political pressure from within the EPRDF, as well as from the wider Ethiopian public, to meet force with force.

War

Chronology

6 May 1998 – 22 February 1999 

After a series of armed incidents in which several Eritrean officials were killed near Badme, on 6 May 1998, a large Eritrean mechanized force entered the Badme region along the border of Eritrea and Ethiopia's northern Tigray Region, resulting in a firefight between the Eritrean soldiers and the Tigrayan militia and security police they encountered. On 13 May 1998, Ethiopia, in what Eritrean radio described as a "total war" policy, mobilized its forces for a full assault against Eritrea. The Claims Commission found that this was, in essence, an affirmation of the existence of a state of war between belligerents, not a declaration of war, and that Ethiopia also notified the United Nations Security Council, as required under Article 51 of the UN Charter.

The fighting quickly escalated to exchanges of artillery and tank fire, leading to four weeks of intense fighting. Ground troops fought on three fronts. On 5 June 1998, the Eritrean airforce attacked an elementary school in Mekelle that killed 49 of the students and their parents and the neighbors that came to help immediately. Four more people died after reaching hospital. The victims ranged from a three-month-old baby to a 65-year-old man. The Ethiopian Air Force launched air attacks on the airport in Asmara as a retaliation. Eritreans also attacked the airport of Mekele. These raids caused civilian casualties and deaths on both sides of the border. The United Nations Security Council adopted Resolution 1177 condemning the use of force and welcomed statements from both sides to end the air strikes.

There was then a lull as both sides mobilized huge forces along their common border and dug extensive trenches. Both countries spent several hundred million dollars on new military equipment. This was despite the peace mediation efforts by the Organization of African Unity (OAU) and a US/Rwanda peace plan that was in the works. The US/Rwanda proposal was a four-point peace plan that called for withdrawal of both forces to pre-June 1998 positions. Eritrea refused, and instead demanded the demilitarization of all disputed areas along the common border, to be overseen by a neutral monitoring force, and direct talks.

22 February 1999 – 12 May 2000 
With Eritrea's refusal to accept the US/Rwanda peace plan, on 22 February 1999, Ethiopia launched a massive military offensive to recapture Badme. Tension had been high since 6 February 1999, when Ethiopia claimed that Eritrea had violated the moratorium on air raids by bombing Adigrat, a claim it later withdrew. Surveying the extensive trenches the Eritreans had constructed, Ethiopian General Samora Yunis observed, "The Eritreans are good at digging trenches and we are good at converting trenches into graves. They, too, know this. We know each other very well".

Ethiopia's offensive, codenamed Operation Sunset, began with an air attack on Assab airport by four Ethiopian fighter jets, followed by a massive artillery barrage against Eritrean positions on the Tsorona front, which was meant as a diversion to make the Eritreans prepare for an Ethiopian offensive against eastern or southern Eritrea. The following day, the Ethiopian ground attack began. Three Ethiopian divisions broke through the Eritrean defenses in the Biyukundi area and then advanced toward Dukambiya, 20 kilometers southeast of Barentu, before turning east and hitting an Eritrean division north of Badme in the flank, taking the Eritreans by surprise. The Eritrean division was almost totally destroyed and the Ethiopians continued their advance toward Dukambiya. Realizing that they were about to be cut off, the remaining Eritrean units deployed in the Badme area hastily retreated, abandoning nearly 100 kilometers of fortifications and most of their heavy weapons. Ethiopian helicopter gunships attacked the fleeing Eritreans with rockets.

After five days of heavy fighting, Ethiopian forces were 10 kilometers (six miles) deep into Eritrean territory. Eritrea accepted the OAU peace plan on 27 February 1999. While both states said that they accepted the OAU peace plan, Ethiopia did not immediately stop its advance, because it demanded that peace talks be contingent on an Eritrean withdrawal from territory occupied since the first outbreak of fighting. The widespread use of trench warfare by both sides resulted in comparisons of the conflict to the trench warfare of World War I. According to some reports, trench warfare led to the loss of "thousands of young lives in human-wave assaults on Eritrea's positions".

On 16 May, the BBC reported that, after a lull of two weeks, the Ethiopians had attacked at Velessa on the Tsorona front-line, south of Eritrea's capital Asmara and that after two days of heavy fighting, the Eritreans had beaten back the attack, claiming to have destroyed more than 45 Ethiopian tanks; although not able to verify the claim, which the Ethiopian Government dismissed as ridiculous, a BBC reporter did see more than 300 dead Ethiopians and more than 20 destroyed Ethiopian tanks. In June 1999, the fighting continued with both sides in entrenched positions.

12 May – 18 June 2000 
Proximity talks broke down in early May 2000, with Ethiopia accusing Eritrea of imposing "unacceptable conditions." On 12 May, Ethiopia launched a massive combined arms offensive on multiple fronts involving four armored divisions and 22 infantry divisions, extensive artillery and close air support. The Ethiopians used pack animals such as donkeys for logistical support for their infantry, and, due to their cumbersome logistical chain, primarily relied on infantry assaults to capture Eritrean positions. They held their tanks in reserve, then brought them forward to secure positions captured by the infantry. Ethiopian forces initially struggled to exploit the gaps they had torn in the Eritrean positions, often at great cost in frontal assaults against Eritrean trenches. Ethiopian broke through the Eritrean lines between Shambuko and Mendefera, crossed the Mareb River, and cut the road between Barentu and Mendefera, the main supply line for Eritrean troops on the western front of the fighting.

Ethiopian sources stated that on 16 May, Ethiopian aircraft attacked targets between Areza and Maidema, and between Barentu and Omhajer, and that all aircraft returned to base, while heavy ground fighting continued in the Da'se and Barentu area and in Maidema. The next day, Ethiopian ground forces (with air support) captured Da'se. Barentu was taken in a surprise Ethiopian pincer movement on the Western front. The Ethiopians attacked a mined but lightly defended mountain, resulting in the capture of Barentu and an Eritrean retreat. Fighting also continued in Maidema. Also on 17 May, due to the continuing hostilities, the United Nations Security Council adopted Resolution 1298 imposing an arms embargo on both countries.

But the Eritreans claimed they withdrew from the disputed border town of Zalambessa and other disputed areas on the central front as a goodwill' gesture to revive peace talks" and claimed it was a 'tactical retreat' to take away one of Ethiopia's last remaining excuses for continuing the war; a report from Chatham House observes, "the scale of Eritrean defeat was apparent when Eritrea unexpectedly accepted the OAU peace framework." Having recaptured most of the contested territories – and having learned that the Eritrean government would withdraw from any other territories it occupied at the start of the conflict, in accordance with a request from the OAU – Ethiopia declared the war was over on 25 May 2000.

Cessation of hostilities 

On 18 June 2000, the parties agreed to a comprehensive peace agreement and binding arbitration of their disputes under the Algiers Agreement. On 31 July 2000, the United Nations Security Council adopted Resolution 1312 and a 25-kilometer-wide Temporary Security Zone (TSZ) was established within Eritrea, patrolled by the United Nations Mission in Ethiopia and Eritrea (UNMEE) from over 60 countries. On 12 December 2000 a peace agreement was signed by the two governments.

Impact

Casualties 
Eritrea officially claimed that 19,000 Eritrean soldiers were killed during the conflict; Ethiopia claimed to have lost between 34,000–60,000. Meanwhile, Voice of the Democratic Path of Ethiopian Unity, a clandestine political opposition group, alleged that 123,000 Ethiopians were killed, while other reports place the number of Eritrean deaths at around 150,000. Most international reports put the total war casualties from both sides as being around 70,000, but some analysts within the region suggested that the overall death toll may have been as high as 300,000. All these figures have been contested, and other news reports simply state that "tens of thousands" or "as many as 100,000" were killed in the war.

War conduct 
Eritrea accused Ethiopia of using "human waves" to defeat Eritrean trenches. But according to a report by The Independent, there were no "human waves" because Ethiopian troops instead outmanoeuvred and overpowered the Eritrean trenches.

Displacement, abuse and torture 
The fighting led to massive internal displacement in both countries as civilians fled the war zone – by the end of May 2000, Ethiopia occupied about a quarter of Eritrea's territory, displacing 650,000 people, and destroying key components of Eritrea's infrastructure.

The Eritrean government forcibly expelled an estimated 70,000 Ethiopians according to the report by Human rights Watch.  Ethiopia expelled 77,000 Eritreans and Ethiopians of Eritrean origin it deemed a security risk, thus compounding Eritrea's refugee problem. The majority of those were considered well off by the Ethiopian standard of living. They were deported after their belongings had been confiscated. Ethiopians living in Eritrea were interned, and thousands of others were deported. After the retaliatory bombings of Asmara Airport by Ethiopia on 5 and 6 June 1998, many Ethiopians working in Eritrean towns were sacked, apparently as a reprisal, and subsequently lost their rented housing through losing their means of income or, in some cases, by being evicted for being Ethiopian. Many Ethiopians were forced to sleep on the streets outside the Ethiopian embassy in Asmara, in church compounds or elsewhere according to a report by Amnesty International. In July 1998, Ethiopia alleged that up to 60 Ethiopians had died in Assab after being locked in a shipping container by the Eritrean police in daytime temperatures of over 40C.  According to Human Rights Watch, detainees on both sides were subject in some cases to torture, rape, or other degrading treatment. This was believed to be a continuation of the 1991–93 expulsions of 125,000 Ethiopians from Eritrean territory.

Economic disruption 
The economies of both countries were already weak as a result of decades of cold-war politics, colonialism, civil war and drought. The war exacerbated these problems, resulting in food shortages. Prior to the war, much of Eritrea's trade was with Ethiopia, and much of Ethiopia's foreign trade relied on Eritrean roads and ports. According to former Eritrean official Fathi Osman, Eritrea attempted to alleviate its money problems by issuing war bonds to the Eritrean diaspora, as they lacked other means to fund their military operations.

Regional destabilization
The fighting also spread to Somalia as both governments tried to outflank one another. The Eritrean government began supporting the Oromo Liberation Front, a rebel group seeking independence of Oromia from Ethiopia that was based in a part of Somalia controlled by  Mohamed Farrah Aidid. Ethiopia retaliated by supporting groups in southern Somalia who were opposed to Aidid, and by renewing relations with the Islamic regime in Sudan—which is accused of supporting the Eritrean Islamic Salvation, a Sudan-based group that had launched attacks in the Eritrea–Sudan border region—while also lending support to various Eritrean rebel groups including a group known as the Eritrean Islamic Jihad.

Aftermath

Continued tensions

On 13 April 2002, the Eritrea–Ethiopia Boundary Commission that was established under the Algiers Agreement in collaboration with Permanent Court of Arbitration in The Hague agreed upon a "final and binding" verdict. The ruling awarded some territory to each side, but Badme (the flash point of the conflict) was awarded to Eritrea. Martin Pratt writes:

See also 
 
 Tigray War
 List of interstate wars since 1945

Notes

 Banks, Arthur; Muller, Thomas; and Overstreet, William, ed. Political Handbook of the World 2005-6 (A Division of Congressional Quarterly, Inc.: Washington, D.C., 2005), p. 366. 156802952-7

References

Further reading
Books
 Brothers at War: Making Sense of the Eritrean-Ethiopian War (Eastern African Series) by T. Negash, K. Tronvoll, Ohio University Press .
Andrea de Guttry, Harry H. G. Post, and Gabriella Venturini (eds.). 2021. The 1998–2000 Eritrea-Ethiopia War and Its Aftermath in International Legal Perspective. Springer.
News reports
 Ethiopia Eritrea Conflict Archive: News and Article Archive Day to day coverage of war.
Onwar.com: Armed Conflict Events Data: Ethiopian-Eritrean Border War 1999 (Present)
 BBC: War blocks Ethiopia's lifeline 13 April 2000
 BBC:Eritrea and Ethiopia at war 16 May 2000
 BBC: Ethiopia's next move  22 May 2000
 BBC: Horn peace boost 30 March 2001
 BBC: Eritrean PoWs return home 29 November 2002
 BBC: Peace 'undermined' by Ethiopia 10 March 2003
Summary
Ethiopia / Eritrea War GlobalSecurity.org 2000–2005
Eritrea – Ethiopia Conflict Page This site is developed and maintained by Denden LLC and dehai.org. The site was initially developed by the Eritrean Media and Information Task Force (Badme Task Force), a volunteer group of Eritrean-Americans in the Washington Metropolitan Area.
Tom Cooper & Jonathan Kyzer. II Ethiopian Eritrean War, 1998 – 2000 website of ACIG.ORG 2 September 2003. Details the use of air power during the war.
Analysis
Abbink, Jon. 'Law against reality? Contextualizing the Ethiopian-Eritrean border problem.' In: Andrea de Guttry, Harry Post & Gabriella Venturini, eds., The 1998–2000 War Between Eritrea and Ethiopia: An International Legal Perspective, pp. 141–158. The Hague: T.M.C. Asser Press – Cambridge: Cambridge University Press, 2009.
Charity Butcher & Makda Maru (2018) Diversionary Tactics and the Ethiopia–Eritrea War (1998–2000), Small Wars & Insurgencies, 29:1, 68-90
Connell, Dan Eritrea-Ethiopia War Looms, Foreign Policy in Focus 21 January 2004
Gilkes, Patrick and Plaut, Martin. The War Between Ethiopia and Eritrea, Foreign Policy in Focus Volume 5, Number 25 August 2000
Hamilton, Kevin   Analysis of the Ethio-Eritrean conflict and international mediation efforts in the Princeton Journal of Public and International Affairs, Volume 11 Spring 2000
Reid, Richard "Old Problems in New Conflicts: Some Observations on Eritrea and Its Relations with Tigray, from Liberation Struggle to Inter-State War", Africa: Journal of the International African Institute, 73 (2003), pp. 369–401
Staff. Eritrea – Ethiopia Conflict Analysis Page This site is developed and maintained by Denden LLC and dehai.org. The site was initially developed by the Eritrean Media and Information Task Force (Badme Task Force), a volunteer group of Eritrean-Americans in the Washington Metropolitan Area. It includes documents from non-Eritrean sources as well as analysis by Eritreans.
Other
Demarcation Watch. A list of articles on the demarcation dispute. This site is developed and maintained by Denden LLC and dehai.org. The site was initially developed by the Eritrean Media and Information Task Force (Badme Task Force), a volunteer group of Eritrean-Americans in the Washington Metropolitan Area.
Brothers at Arms – Eritrea. A news clip filmed by Journeyman Pictures during the war.

 
1998 in Eritrea
1998 in Ethiopia
1999 in Eritrea
1999 in Ethiopia
2000 in Eritrea
2000 in Ethiopia
Conflicts in 1998
Conflicts in 1999
Conflicts in 2000
Eritrea–Ethiopia military relations
Permanent Court of Arbitration cases
Wars involving Ethiopia
Wars involving Eritrea
Wars involving the states and peoples of Africa